Alikoski is a surname. Notable people with the surname include:

Heikki A. Alikoski (1912–1997), Finnish astronomer
Mikko Alikoski (born 1986), Finnish ice hockey player

See also
1567 Alikoski, a main-belt asteroid

Finnish-language surnames